L'inimico delle donne (The Enemy of Women) is an Italian-language comic opera in 3 acts by Baldassare Galuppi to a libretto by Giovanni Bertati. It was Galuppi's first collaboration with Bertali, and premiered autumn 1771 Venice, at the Teatro San Samuele. The opera ran for 10 years. A modern revival directed by Stefano Mazzonis di Pralafera was given in February 2011 at the Opera de Wallonie, Liège.

Cast
Agnesina, an Italian girl, soprano
Zon-Zon, emperor of China, tenor
Geminiano, baritono
Xunchia, soprano
Ly-lam, tenor
Kam-si, soprano
Si-sin, baritono
Zyda, mezzo-soprano
strings, 2 oboes, 2 cornettos, bassoon, harpsichord

Recordings
DVD, Filippo Adami, Anna Maria Panzarella, Alberto Rinaldi,  Opera Royal de Wallonie Orchestra. Rinaldo Alessandrini Dynamic

References

1771 operas
Operas by Baldassare Galuppi
Italian-language operas